The following is a list of paintings by the Italian artist Caravaggio, listed chronologically.

List of paintings

Footnotes

Further reading
 
 
 
 
 
  
 
 
 
 
 

 List
Caravaggio